In a Perfect World is a 1994 studio album by the Aquarium Rescue Unit. It was the band's first studio album, following two live releases, and their first record following the departure of former frontman Bruce Hampton.

Reception

In a review for AllMusic, JT Griffith wrote: "The album is packed with some great jams and beautiful sounds," but noted that although it "probably translated well live," "on record the band falls flat."

John Swenson, editor of The Rolling Stone Jazz & Blues Album Guide, awarded the album 4 stars, calling it "a burnished fusion effort featuring magnificent performances from Herring and Oteil Burbridge."

Writer Dean Budnick commented: "The level of musicianship is quite high on this disc... Burbridge is... creative and compelling... Herring distinguishes himself on a number of tunes."

No Treble's Ryan Madora praised Burbridge's playing on "The Garden," stating that he "exhibits impeccable technique," and "uses clever interval leaps and chords during the flute solo, only to give way to a fierce and acutely punctuated groove before returning to the original theme."

Track listing
 "Search Yourself" (Henson, Herring) – 5:58
 "Stand up People" (Ingram) – 4:58
 "How Tight's Yer Drawers" (Henson, Herring) – 3:50
 "The Garden" (Bubridge, Henson) – 5:04
 "Swallows"  (Bubridge, Bubridge, Henson) – 5:12
 "Headstrong" (Henson, Herring) – 4:25
 "Plain or Peanut" (Burbridge) – 2:25
 "Highly Overrated" (Burbridge, Burbridge, Henson) – 4:33
 "Overload" (Burbridge, Henson) – 5:46
 "Satisfaction Guaranteed" (Baird) – 4:03
 "Turn It On" (Burbridge, Henson) – 4:34
 "Splash" (Burbridge) – 4:12

Personnel
 Jeff Sipe / Apt. Q258 – drums, percussion, "Harmonorbital", Kelnabor, Crontex, Strohgen
 Oteil Burbridge – 5- and 6-string bass
 Kofi Burbridge – flute, keyboards, acoustic piano
 Paul Henson – lead vocals
 Jimmy Herring – guitar, guitar synthesizer
 Count M'Butu – percussion
 Beth Harris – backing vocals on "Overload"
 Lincoln Metcalf – Chazoid

Notes

1994 albums
Aquarium Rescue Unit albums